Piotr Paziński (born 7 August 1987) is a Polish taekwondo athlete.

He represented Poland at the 2016 Summer Olympics in Rio de Janeiro, in the men's 80 kg.

References

1987 births
Living people
Polish male taekwondo practitioners
Olympic taekwondo practitioners of Poland
Taekwondo practitioners at the 2016 Summer Olympics
Sportspeople from Warsaw
European Taekwondo Championships medalists
Taekwondo practitioners at the 2015 European Games
European Games competitors for Poland
20th-century Polish people
21st-century Polish people